Chipring is a village and Village Development Committee  in Khotang District in the Sagarmatha Zone of eastern Nepal. At the time of the 1991 Nepal census it had a population of 1,331 persons living in 263 individual households.

References

External links
UN map of the municipalities of Khotang District

Populated places in Khotang District